Prominent inferior labial artery is characterized by the appearance of a pulsating papule in the lower vermilion, a centimeter of two from the oral comissure, formed by an especially tortuous segment of the inferior labial artery.

See also
Skin lesion

References

 
Dermal and subcutaneous growths